Carex enneastachya is a tussock-forming perennial in the family Cyperaceae. It is native to north eastern parts of South America.

See also
List of Carex species

References

enneastachya
Plants described in 1908
Taxa named by Charles Baron Clarke
Flora of Colombia
Flora of Peru
Flora of Ecuador
Flora of Bolivia